Indexovo radio pozorište (Index's radio theater) was a Serbian radio comedy programme led by Slobodan Bićanin, Dragoljub Ljubičić, and Branislav Petrušević, that eventually evolved into a satirical theater troupe. They were formed around state-owned Beograd 202 radio where they had a weekly show on Sundays. Their comedy program was diverse, from phone call jokes to various songs about Slobodan Milosevic's regime in Yugoslavia, reflecting political problems between the Serbian and Albanian population in Kosovo and the NATO bombing.

Famous plays 
 Ne ostavljajte me samog dok himna svira
 Svet ili ništa
 Izbori jer ste vi to tražili
 Istočno od rajha
 Brat i mir
 Tamo daleko je sunce
 the song "El Kondor pada"

External links
 Newly formed Indexovci, without Dragoljub Ljubičić
 

Serbian radio programs
Theatre in Serbia
Serbian comedians
Serbian satirists